Svenska Cupen 1969–70 was the fifteenth season of the main Swedish football Cup. The competition was concluded on 28 May 1970 with the final, held at Studenternas IP, Uppsala. Åtvidabergs FF won 2-0 against Sandvikens IF before an attendance of 3,110 spectators.

First round
For all results see SFS-Bolletinen - Matcher i Svenska Cupen.

Second round
For all results see SFS-Bolletinen - Matcher i Svenska Cupen.

Third round
For all results see SFS-Bolletinen - Matcher i Svenska Cupen.

Fourth round
For all results see SFS-Bolletinen - Matcher i Svenska Cupen.

Fifth round
For all results see SFS-Bolletinen - Matcher i Svenska Cupen.

Quarter-finals
Three quarter finals were held on 11 October 1969, the remaining quarter final was held on 20 March 1970. The replay match was held on 4 April 1970.

Semi-finals
The semi-finals in this round were played on 7 May 1969, the replay match was played on 18 May 1969.

Final
The final was played on 28 May 1970 at Studenternas IP.

Footnotes

References 

Svenska Cupen seasons
Cupen
Cupen
Sweden